Tuoll on mun kultani (There is my sweetheart) is a Finnish folk song from the Kanteletar.

References

Finnish songs